Fonte Aleixo is a settlement in the southern part of the island of Fogo, Cape Verde. It is situated 3 km south of Achada Furna and 16 km southeast of the island capital São Filipe. In 2010 its population was 401.

See also
List of villages and settlements in Cape Verde

References

Villages and settlements in Fogo, Cape Verde
Santa Catarina do Fogo